Tropanisopodus is a genus of beetles in the family Cerambycidae, containing the following species:

 Tropanisopodus andinus Tippmann, 1960
Tropanisopodus antonkozlovi Nascimento & Santos-Silva, 2019
Tropanisopodus kozlovi Nascimento & Santos-Silva, 2019
 Tropanisopodus tachira Monne & Monne, 2007

References

Acanthocinini